Beltheca oni is a moth of the family Gelechiidae. It was described by Kawahara and Adamski in 2006. It is found in Costa Rica.

The length of the forewings is 3.5-4.6 mm. The forewings are dark bronze, with short, narrow scales along the swollen base of the subcosta and radius. The hindwings are dark brown. Adults of both sexes dance in circles on the surface of different kinds of leaves. When dancing, the moth secures one of its forelegs as a pivot while shuffling the other legs laterally so that it can run rapidly in a circle. This behavior may mimic the movement of salticid jumping spiders, but may be associated with courtship.

References

Moths described in 2006
Anacampsinae